Neoprotoparmelia capensis is a species of saxicolous (rock-dwelling), crustose lichen in the family Parmeliaceae. Found in South Africa, it was formally described as a new species in 2018 by Víctor Jiménez Rico, Ana Crespo, and Garima Singh. The type specimen was collected between Papendorp and Strandfontein (Western Cape Province); the specific epithet refers to the province in which it was discovered.

References

capensis
Lichen species
Lichens described in 2018
Lichens of South Africa
Taxa named by Ana Crespo